The California butterfly ray (Gymnura marmorata) is a species of ray in the family Gymnuridae. It is found in Colombia, Costa Rica, Ecuador, El Salvador, Guatemala, Honduras, Mexico, Nicaragua, Panama, Peru, and the United States. Its natural habitats are shallow seas, subtidal aquatic beds, coral reefs, estuarine waters, intertidal marshes, and coastal saline lagoons.

References

Sources

Gymnura
Fish of Guatemala
Taxonomy articles created by Polbot
Fish described in 1864
Taxa named by James Graham Cooper